The Taoer is a river in Northeast China. It is a right tributary of the Nen River. The source of the river is in the Greater Khingan, Inner Mongolia. It flows through Jilin where it joins the Nen River near Da'an.

References 

Rivers of Inner Mongolia
Rivers of Jilin